Beast Made of Night is a 2017 young adult fantasy novel by Nigerian-American novelist Tochi Onyebuchi. It is the first book in a duology set in a magical world inspired by Nigeria.

Reception 
Beast Made of Night received positive reviews for its world building and themes. A review from NPR lauded the novel as the beginning of a great saga. In a starred review, Kirkus praised it as a story that "moves beyond the boom-bang, boring theology of so many fantasies—and, in the process, creates, almost griotlike, a paean to an emerging black legend". Time recognized the book as one of the 100 Best Fantasy Books of All Time, praising Onyebuchi's creativity and world building.

Award 
 2018  Nommo Award for Best Speculative Fiction Novel, won

Sequel 
A sequel, Crown of Thunder, was released by Razorbill in 2018.

References 

Nigerian-American novels
Novels set in Nigeria
Africanfuturist novels
2017 American novels
2017 fantasy novels
American fantasy novels
African-American young adult novels
American young adult novels
Debut fantasy novels
2017 debut novels
Nigerian English-language novels
Nigerian fantasy novels
Novels by Tochi Onyebuchi
2017 Nigerian novels
Razorbill books